A Beautiful Valley is a 2011 Israeli drama by Hadar Friedlich. It was her feature directorial debut.

The film premiered at the Jerusalem Film Festival in July 2011 where it received the award for Best Full-Length Debut. In a controversial decision by the festival management, however, the prize was revoked at the last minute following a complaint of an alleged conflict of interest by one of the jury members. It was also nominated for a 2011 Ophir Award in the Best Actress and Best Cinematography categories received a Special Jury Mention at the San Sebastián International Film Festival, and won the Critic's Prize at the Cinémed Montpellier Film Festival.

Plot
Hanna Mendelssohn (Batia Bar), an elderly widow, is a proud founding member of her kibbutz and has devoted most of her life to its development. When it is threatened with bankruptcy and privatized, she is forced out of her job as the community's gardener, turning from a hard-working productive member of society into a dependent burden.  Although she still believes in the values of social equality and cooperation that characterized the kibbutz in its early years, Hanna struggles to maintain her usefulness and sense of worth in a society undergoing a sudden and profound transformation.

Cast
Batia Bar as Hanna
Gili Ben-Ozilio as Yael
Hadar Avigad as Naama
Eli Ben-rey as Shimon
Hadas Porat as Odeda
Ruth Geller as Miriam

Critical reception
Jay Weissberg of Variety said Friedlich's debut "tackles a forgotten subject with sensitivity".

References

External links
 

2011 films
2010s Hebrew-language films
Israeli drama films
2011 drama films
Films about the kibbutz